Minnehaha is a census-designated place (CDP) in Clark County, Washington, United States. The population was 9,771 at the 2010 census, up from 7,689 at the 2000 census.

Name meaning 
This area got its name from a Columbian newspaper editorial in 1891. The editor wrote about Burnt Bridge Creek and called it "Minnehaha, laughing water," from Longfellow's poem "The Song of Hiawatha". The name appealed to the citizenry and they kept it. Before that the area was called the "Black Forest" for its thick timber.

While Minnehaha, a Native American word, is often translated as "Laughing Water", the correct translation is "curling water" or "waterfall", as in Minnehaha Falls, Minnesota. The name comes from the Dakota language.

Geography
Minnehaha is located in southwestern Clark County at  (45.656, -122.622). It is bordered on the west, south, and east by the city of Vancouver and on the north by Walnut Grove.

Demographics

As of the census of 2000, there were 7,689 people, 2,795 households, and 2,031 families residing in the CDP. The population density was 3,464.1 people per square mile (1,337.3/km2). There were 2,907 housing units at an average density of 1,309.7/sq mi (505.6/km2). The racial makeup of the CDP was 88.28% White, 2.20% African American, 0.95% Native American, 2.81% Asian, 0.62% Pacific Islander, 2.09% from other races, and 3.04% from two or more races. Hispanic or Latino of any race were 4.10% of the population. 15.0% were of German, 13.2% English, 8.2% American and 7.8% Irish ancestry according to Census 2000.

There were 2,795 households, out of which 36.2% had children under the age of 18 living with them, 57.1% were married couples living together, 11.0% had a female householder with no husband present, and 27.3% were non-families. 20.9% of all households were made up of individuals, and 7.7% had someone living alone who was 65 years of age or older. The average household size was 2.75 and the average family size was 3.18.

In the CDP, the age distribution of the population shows 28.6% under the age of 18, 7.7% from 18 to 24, 28.6% from 25 to 44, 24.3% from 45 to 64, and 10.8% who were 65 years of age or older. The median age was 36 years. For every 100 females, there were 97.2 males. For every 100 females age 18 and over, there were 95.2 males.

The median income for a household in the CDP was $46,766, and the median income for a family was $50,585. Males had a median income of $39,167 versus $28,984 for females. The per capita income for the CDP was $20,023. About 8.9% of families and 11.3% of the population were below the poverty line, including 15.9% of those under age 18 and 7.0% of those age 65 or over.

References

External links
 Columbian newspaper article from 1928

Census-designated places in Clark County, Washington
Census-designated places in Washington (state)